Kobad may refer to:
 Kavadh I
 Kobad, Iran
 Kai Kobad